Sir Joel Nathan Bennathan , styled Mr Justice Bennathan, is a British High Court judge.

Attending Queen Mary College, Bennathan was the first lawyer in his family. He would later be called to the Bar in 1985 by Middle Temple. He was appointed King's Counsel in 2006 by the then monarch Elizabeth II. Before becoming a Judge, Bennathan worked in Dougherty Street Chambers. He worked as a defence barrister, specialising in criminal law and up until his appointment undertook a number of high profile cases.

He was appointed as a Recorder in 2009 to the South Eastern Circuit. 

Bennathan is a guest lecturer at London South Bank University for their Law Degree Course.

In January 2019 Bennathan was shortlisted for the 'Crime Silk of The Year' award.

In December 2021 the then monarch Queen Elizabeth II approved his appointment as Justice of the High Court. He assumed his position on the 11th of January 2022 and was assigned to the Kings Bench Division. He has not yet received his customary Knight Bachelor.

References 

1961 births
Living people
Alumni of Queen Mary University of London
21st-century English judges
High Court judges (England and Wales)
21st-century King's Counsel